Parliamentary elections were held in Greece on 16 December 1923. The result was a victory for the Liberal Party, which won 250 of the 398 seats.

Background
After the defeat of the Liberals in 1920, Eleftherios Venizelos left the country, King Constantine I returned and Greece was soundly defeated by  the newly reformed Turkey in the war in Anatolia. After the death of King Constantine, his eldest son George was proclaimed King George II. After the national defeat and the definitive Treaty of Lausanne however, Greece was sorely divided.
 
On 18 October 1923 the decree for calling elections to the Fourth National Assembly of the Greeks was published. The date of the elections was set for 2 December, and on 19 October, military law and censorship were abolished. Two days later, there was what came to be called a "counter-revolutionary" uprising against the government. This uprising was suppressed but it influenced in a significant way the political situation in the country since the military leaders behind it were pressing for the expulsion of King George and the proclamation of a republic.

Results

Aftermath
The pro-monarchist parties abstained and the Liberals won 250 of the 398 seats. Following the elections, the King was forced to leave the country, with Admiral Pavlos Koundouriotis appointed as a regent. The new parliament convened on 2 January 1924. The office of Prime Minister was held for a short time by Eleftherios Venizelos and Georgios Kafandaris before Alexandros Papanastasiou was appointed to the post on 24 March 1924. His programmatic statement of legislative proposals was perhaps the most radical document which had up to that time ever been read out in the Hellenic Parliament. Its basic aim was to proclaim a republic. On the next day (25 March), Parliament voted to proclaim a republic, and this was endorsed in a referendum held on 13 April 1924.

Following the referendum, Pavlos Koundouriotis was elected president by Parliament.

References

Parliamentary elections in Greece
Greece
Legislative election
1920s in Greek politics
History of Greece (1909–1924)
Greece
Legl